Ekaterina Tankeeva (born 28 June 1989, Moscow) is a Russian water polo player. At the 2012 Summer Olympics, she competed for the Russia women's national water polo team in the women's event.

See also
 List of World Aquatics Championships medalists in water polo

References

External links
 

Russian female water polo players
1989 births
Living people
Olympic water polo players of Russia
Water polo players at the 2012 Summer Olympics
World Aquatics Championships medalists in water polo
Universiade medalists in water polo
Sportspeople from Moscow
Universiade bronze medalists for Russia
Medalists at the 2009 Summer Universiade
21st-century Russian women